Thane (formerly Thana, station code: TNA) is an A1 category major railway station of the Indian Railways serving the city of Thane, Located in Maharashtra, it is one of the busiest railway stations in India. , Thane railway station handles 260000 people daily. More than 1,000 trains visit the station each day, including 330+ long-distance trains. The station has ten platforms. It is the origin and destination station of all the trans-harbour suburban trains. Thane is India's first passanger railway Station along with Boribunder Railway Station.

History 

Thane railway station was the terminus for the first ever passenger train in India.

Platforms 
 – For UP Thane trains (towards Mumbai CST)
 – For DOWN slow trains (towards Kalyan Junction)
 – For UP (towards Mumbai CST) and DOWN (towards Kalyan) Thane trains
 – For UP slow/fast trains (towards Mumbai CST)
 – For DOWN fast trains / Mail-Express trains
 – For UP fast trains / Mail-Express trains
 – For DOWN Mail/Express trains (trains that arrive from Lokmanya Tilak Terminus)
 – For UP Mail/Express trains (trains that depart to LTT)
 – For Thane – // trains
 – 10A.- For Thane – // trains

See also

 Timeline of Mumbai history

References 

Mumbai CR railway division
Mumbai Suburban Railway stations
Railway stations in India opened in 1853
Railway stations in Thane district
Transport in Thane
Buildings and structures in Thane
Indian Railway A1 Category Stations